1991 World Masters Athletics Championships is the ninth in a series of World Masters Athletics Outdoor Championships (called World Veterans Championships at the time) that took place in Turku, Finland from 18 to 28 July 1991.

The main venue was Paavo Nurmi Stadium.

Satellite tracks were located in nearby municipalities of Raisio and Kaarina.

This edition of masters athletics Championships had a minimum age limit of 35 years for women and 40 years for men.

The governing body of this series is World Association of Veteran Athletes (WAVA). WAVA was formed during meeting at the inaugural edition of this series at Toronto in 1975, then officially founded during the second edition in 1977, then renamed as World Masters Athletics (WMA) at the Brisbane Championships in 2001.

This Championships was organized by WAVA in coordination with a Local Organising Committee (LOC) headed by Sten-Olof Hansen.

In addition to a full range of track and field events,

non-stadia events included 10K Cross Country, 10K Race Walk (women), 20K Race Walk (men), and Marathon.

South Africa
South Africa had been expelled by the International Amateur Athletic Federation (IAAF) in 1976 due to the apartheid policy of the South African government at that time.

The participation of South African athletes in WAVA competitions had been at odds with the IAAF, specifically due to the 1977 WAVA constitution which had stated that

As a compromise, South Africans often competed at these Championships under the flag of other nations before 1987.

During General Assembly at the 1987 Championships, WAVA delegates approved a motion to amend the WAVA constitution and exclude countries whose national federation is suspended by the IAAF.

Thus South African athletes were officially banned from these Championships, and would not be welcomed back until the 1993 edition in Miyazaki,

after the abolition of apartheid and the readmittance of South Africa into IAAF in 1992.

Results
Past Championships results are archived at WMA.

Additional archives are available from Museum of Masters Track & Field

as a pdf book,

in pdf newsletters from National Masters News,

and as a searchable pdf extracted from the September 1991 newsletter.

Several masters world records were set at this Championships. World records for 1991 are from the lists of World Records in the Museum of Masters Track & Field pdf book,

supplemented by another list of World Records in the September 1991 newsletter.

The winners from each of the age-group 100m races were invited to participate in a  "Special WAVA Age-Graded 100",

where runners were given distance handicaps based on WAVA age-graded tables.

The winners were M55 Hugo Hartenstein in 10.55 and W40 Geraldine Otto in 11.22.

The blind sprinter Fritz Assmy, now in the M75 class and guided by his grandson,

set new WRs in the 100m and 200m sprints,

running in his assigned lane 8 to avoid getting in the way of other competitors.

He had been guided by his son-in-law in 1977, 1979 and 1981, and by his son in 1983 and 1985. This was his last WAVA Championships; he would not compete in 1993 and would pass away in 2000.

Women

Men

References

World Masters Athletics Championships
World Masters Athletics Championships
International athletics competitions hosted by Finland
1991
Masters athletics (track and field) records